Triggering receptor expressed on myeloid cells 1 (TREM1) an immunoglobulin (Ig) superfamily transmembrane protein that, in humans, is encoded by the TREM1 gene. TREM1 is constitutively expressed on the surface of peripheral blood monocytes and neutrophils, and upregulated by toll-like receptor (TLR) ligands; activation of TREM1 amplifies immune responses.

Function 

Monocyte-, macrophage- and neutrophil-mediated inflammatory responses can be stimulated via receptors such as G protein-linked 7-transmembrane receptors (such as FPR1), Fc receptors, CD14, TLRs (such as TLR4), and cytokine receptors. TREM1 amplifies TLR-induced inflammation by increasing production of inflammatory cytokines. The ligand of TREM1 is unknown, however, bacterial infection, ischemic stroke and challenge with lipopolysaccharide or lipoteichoic acid were observed to increase TREM1 expression. In granulocytes, C/EBPε induces TREM1 expression independently from inflammatory response.

TREM1 forms a complex with transmembrane adaptor DAP12 and, upon TREM1 engagement, a protein tyrosine kinase Syk-mediated cascade of tyrosine phosphorylation is initiated, activating downstream mediators such as PLCγ, PI3K, and MAPK. This cascade promotes the release of inflammatory cytokines and/or chemokines by neutrophils and macrophages, as well as their migration.

Based on laboratory studies, TREM1 might be involved in development of atherosclerosis, non-alcoholic fatty liver disease (NAFLD),  and ischemic stroke.

Cancer 
TREM1 expression is higher in tumor vs non-tumor tissues, likely due to its expression by myeloid cells that infiltrate tumors. TREM1 is expressed by myeloid immune-suppressive cell populations such as monocytic myeloid-derived suppressor cells (mMDSC), tumor-associated neutrophils (TANs), and tumor associated macrophages (TAMs). These types of tumor-associated myeloid infiltrate correlate with shorter survival times of patients with solid tumors, and are likely to be the reason that not all tumors respond to checkpoint inhibitor therapy. Antibodies that target TREM1 are therefore being studied for use in treatment patients with tumors that do not respond to checkpoint inhibitor therapy.

Flow cytometric analyses of human tumor-infiltrating myeloid cells isolated from breast cancer, bladder cancer, endometrial cancer, head and neck squamous cell carcinoma, ovarian cancer, prostate cancer, and renal cell carcinoma tissues demonstrated that within tumors, TREM1 is enriched on myeloid subsets, including mMDSCs, TANs, TAMs (AACR-NCI-EORTC Virtual International Conference on Molecular Targets and Cancer Therapeutics 2021 abstract no. P104). Single-cell immune profiling of stage III-C ovarian tumor specimens revealed that TREM1 is specifically expressed in TAM and monocytes in these tumors (AACR-NCI-EORTC INTERNATIONAL CONFERENCE ON MOLECULAR TARGETS AND CANCER THERAPEUTICS 2019 abstract no. C105). Additional studies found high expression of TREM1 protein and TREM1 mRNA, respectively, in TAMs and monocytes in human tumors (Immunotherapy of Cancer Conference (ITOC) 2021 Abstract P02.11, Society for the Immunotherapy of Cancer (SITC) Conference 2021, Poster 859).

Higher levels of TREM1 mRNA in tumor tissues correlate with shorter survival times of patients with colon cancer, breast cancer, pancreatic cancer, and squamous cell carcinoma (AACR-NCI-EORTC INTERNATIONAL CONFERENCE ON MOLECULAR TARGETS AND CANCER THERAPEUTICS 2019 abstract no. C105).

Soluble TREM1 
During inflammation, a soluble form of the molecule (sTREM1) accumulates in the circulation, and is a biomarker of inflammation. There is debate over whether sTREM1 is produced as a splice variant or as the results of proteolytic cleavage. sTREM1 acts as a decoy for the unknown TREM1 ligands, and thereby prevents TREM1 activation. sTREM1 has been studied as a biomarker of development of pneumonia, sepsis, inflammatory bowel diseases, and liver cirrhosis.

Model organisms 

Model organisms have been used in the study of TREM1 function. A conditional knockout mouse line called Trem1tm1(KOMP)Vlcg was generated at the Wellcome Trust Sanger Institute. Male and female animals underwent a standardized phenotypic screen to determine the effects of deletion. Additional screens included immune phenotyping. Blockade of TREM1 protects mice against microbe-induced shock, indicating that it is an important regulator of the immune response.

TREM1 as a Therapeutic Target 
Pionyr Immunotherapeutics is developing PY159 for treatment of advanced solid tumors refractory to or relapsed with the current standard of care. PY159 is a humanized monoclonal antibody that binds TREM1 and acts as an agonist, crosslinking TREM1 to induce signaling through the TREM1-DAP12 complex (SITC 2019 Poster P812, AACR-NCI-EORTC INTERNATIONAL CONFERENCE ON MOLECULAR TARGETS AND CANCER THERAPEUTICS 2019 abstract no. C-105, AACR-NCI-EORTC Virtual International Conference on Molecular Targets and Cancer Therapeutics 2021 Abstract P104, ITOC 2021 Abstract P02.11, SITC 2021 Poster 859). PY159 is being evaluated in a phase 1 trial, in combination with pembrolizumab, in subjects with advanced solid tumors

References

Further reading